Zeuzeropecten lactescens is a species of moth of the family Cossidae. It is found on Madagascar.

References

Moths described in 1930
Zeuzerinae